Villanubla is a municipality located in the province of Valladolid, Castile and León, Spain. According to the 2018 census (INE), the municipality has a population of 2,692 inhabitants.

The Valladolid Airport is located in this municipality.

References

See also
Cuisine of the province of Valladolid

Municipalities in the Province of Valladolid